Serhiy Mykolayovych Zharkov (born 7 May 1958; died 26 July 2012) was a Ukrainian Soviet football player and coach.

Honours
 1977 FIFA World Youth Championship winner with the Soviet Union.

References

External links
 

1958 births
Footballers from Odesa
Living people
Soviet footballers
Ukrainian footballers
Association football defenders
FC Chornomorets Odesa players
SKA Odesa players
SC Odesa players
FC Metalurh Zaporizhzhia players
FC SKA-Lotto Odesa players
Soviet Top League players
Ukrainian Premier League players
Ukrainian First League players
Ukrainian football managers
SC Odesa managers
K. D. Ushinsky South Ukrainian National Pedagogical University alumni